Darreh Sari (also Romanized as Darreh Sārī and Darreh-ye Sārī) is a village in Karchambu-e Jonubi Rural District, in the Central District of Buin va Miandasht County, Isfahan Province, Iran. At the 2006 census, its population was 102, in 22 families.

References 

Populated places in Buin va Miandasht County